Wellington Cricket Club is an amateur cricket club in Wellington, near Telford in Shropshire. Their 1st XI play in the Birmingham and District Premier League Premier Division, which they won in 2003 and 2004. The side was relegated to Division 1 at the end of the 2007 season however was promoted again after finishing 2nd at the end of the 2009 season.

They play their home games at Orleton Park in Wellington, which has also been used for one first-class match between the Minor Counties and the Indian tourists in 1979 and for Minor Counties and List A matches played by Shropshire County Cricket Club.

Teams
Wellington CC has 5 teams. 1st team captain is Wendell Wagner, 2nd team Alex Taylor, 3rd team Simon Topper, 4th team Patrick Howells and 5th team Steven Oliver. Wellington also have an Under 19 squad which is captained by Luke Goring.

Matthew Stinson is the club captain with Steven Oliver being the club chairman.

Notable players
Joseph Smith - represented Shropshire at Minor Counties level 1968-88
Richard Cousins, businessman - played for club 2nd XI in late 1980s and sometime club committee chairman.
Tony Parton – represented Shropshire 1988–2004
Guy Home – represented Shropshire 1991–2006
Adam Byram – represented Shropshire 1989–2002 and Staffordshire 2003
Gavin Byram, his brother – represented Shropshire 1992–2002

References

English club cricket teams
Sport in Telford